The Musée Rolin is an art museum in Autun, Burgundy, France.

Its collections range from Gallo-Roman archaeology to 20th century painting, and are spread over more than twenty rooms. The museum's collections are divided into four departments: archaeology, medieval art, regional history and fine arts (17th to 20th century). It is classified as a "Museum of France", and remains the headquarters of the Société éduenne.

Collection

See also 
List of museums in France

External links 

 Musées de Bourgogne : Autun, Musée Rolin

References 

Museums in Saône-et-Loire
Art museums and galleries in France
History museums in France